Crossplay may refer to: 

 Cross-platform play, the ability of players using different video game systems to play with each other simultaneously
 Crossplay (cosplay), where people cosplay as characters of the opposite sex